Protestantism (which includes both non-evangelical and evangelical denominations) is one of the most common religious minorities in Mexico, although it makes up very small percentage of religion in Mexico when compared to the large Roman Catholic majority. In Mexico, there are many denominations from virtually all doctrinal backgrounds, the largest of which are: Presbyterian, Baptist, Methodist, Pentecostals and a group of unaffiliated non-denominational charismatic congregations. In the census, some of these congregations and their followers are grouped as "Neo-Charismatic", others are grouped as "Evangelicals".

The charismatic movement in Mexico has been growing in the last several decades, particularly in the southern state of Chiapas, where the National Presbyterian Church in Mexico is the strongest denomination (46% of the total Presbyterian population of Mexico). Protestantism also has a large following in the Mexican states that border the U.S. state of Texas.

In 2010 those who declared themselves Catholics represented 83.9 percent of the population aged 5 and older, evangelical Protestants or 7.6 percent, and other religions 2.5 percent and 4.6 percent reported having no religion. In 2020, Protestants account for 12% of population.

The National Institute of Statistics and Geography (INEGI) reported that the number of evangelicals or Protestants rose from 4.9% in 1990 to 5.2% in 2000, reaching 7.6% in 2010.

Denominations

A main category of the Protestant churches in Mexico are the so-called Historical denominations, which include the following churches: Presbyterian (and other Calvinistic groups), Baptist, Lutheran, Methodist, Congregational and Anglican (or Episcopalian). These constitute the 10% of the Protestant/Evangelical category. After these branches, we have the "Pentecostal and Neo-Pentecostal" segment, which constitutes about 22% of the non-Catholic category. With a 39% we have "Other evangelical" members, a group called "Light of the World" (based in the city of Guadalajara) makes 1%, and finally the "Non-Evangelical Biblical" categorization makes up the remaining 28% of this figure.

Growth and social interaction 

Protestants/Evangelicals have had a respectful and often peaceful relationship with their overwhelmingly Catholic atmosphere. Conflict is however common in indigenous communities in the State of Mexico and the southern state of Chiapas (the state with the greatest percentage of Protestants nationwide). Despite their long-time status of minority, Mexican Protestants interact normally with the rest of Mexico.

Because of historical reasons (the laic character of Mexico which, in theory, does not intend to favor any religion) and unlike many other countries, Mexican Protestants do not have many institutions such as day care centers, schools, universities, labor unions, political parties and hospitals. This forces Evangelicals to interact with the rest of society using the same services and attending the same educational institutions.

Regardless of regional variations, Protestants in Mexico are becoming more relevant to the Catholic majority as many of these churches continue to grow greatly because many Protestants were once Catholics and converted later to Protestantism. Subsequently, they tend to share their new spiritual experiences with their Catholic relatives and neighbors, inciting curiosity because their life-changing testimony often ushers a new stage in their lives (frequently asceticism) which changes their worldview and their personal behavior. Protestants often invite people to their churches, which sometimes leads to further spiritual encounter and revivals. This is when more people become Protestants.

Regions and identity shift

The fact that more and more Mexicans no longer describe or define themselves as Catholic is significant issue amongst the country's Catholic population, many of whom consider Mexico a sacred Catholic land. This shows a society that tends to diversify into other paths regarding religious adherence. Nevertheless, the proportion or magnitude of this shift varies greatly and it is not the same throughout the country.

As a generalized interpretation, Protestants have grown to be a very relevant minority in Southern Mexico and to a lesser though still significant percentage in Northern Mexico, especially in border states (and particularly those that border Texas). Places where Protestantism has not become such a big minority are the West and the central parts (known as the Bajío), which is known as a very Catholic region.  
The following chart shows us the variations of religious affiliation of the Mexican population by state and doctrine to which inhabitants older than 5 adhere:

Source:

See also 
 Religion in Mexico

References

 
Mexico